The fort Quélern or réduit de Quélern is a castle and prison in the commune of Roscanvel in France.

Construction
This fort was built between 1852 and 1854 on modified plans by Sébastien Le Prestre de Vauban (1633–1707).

It is an enclosure in the form of a square fort, bastioned and surrounded by a dug ditch.

The redoubt was built between 1852 and 1854 behind the Quélern lines, at the tightest point of the Roscanvel peninsula, in order to protect the peninsula's works from rear attacks.

A fort project had already been issued by Vauban at the end of the 17th century, but it had not been built with the exception of the southern front integrated into the defensive system of the Quélern lines.

After the war of 1870, an underground powder magazine type 1874 was built there and since destroyed.

Description
It is a strong rectangle 230 m long by 170 m wide, surrounded by a ditch 7 m wide on average dug into the rock.

The scarp is semi-detached on the western, northern and eastern fronts and tied on the southern front.

Prison

In 1871, Fort Quélern was divided into two parts, the northern part was a closed area for prisoners living in barracks originally intended for soldiers.

In the center of these chambers were the administrative rooms, the accommodation of the director, the guards, while the southern part has been preserved for military use.

Several hundred Communards, including the geographer Élisée Reclus (1830 –1905) and the politician Jean Allemane (1843-1935), were condemned to serve their sentence in the Fort Quélern, from April 1871 to March 1875.

Before the prison closed, 124 Algerian prisoners passed through Fort Quélern where 6 died there, including Mohamed ben Fialah.

The latter rest in a cemetery not far away in the harbor of Brest among the Communards on the Île des Morts.

Garrison
Even if it served as a prison, the Fort Quélern was above all intended to further strengthen the protection of the isthmus of the Roscanvel peninsula.

Gallery

See also
 Sébastien Le Prestre de Vauban
 Mokrani Revolt
 Cheikh Boumerdassi

References

External links 
 2004 Aerial photograph

Castles in France
Barracks in France
Military installations of France
Prisons in France
Penal labour
Mokrani Revolt